Yongning is a town under the administration of Tonggu County, Jiangxi, China. , it has 6 residential communities, 10 villages, and one forest farm under its administration.

References 

Township-level divisions of Jiangxi
Tonggu County